Victor Majid (born 21 April 1992) is a Kenyan international footballer who plays for Mufulira Wanderers, as a midfielder.

Career
Born in Busia, Majid has played club football for SoNy Sugar, Karuturi Sports, Bandari, Kenya Commercial Bank, Chemelil Sugar and A.F.C. Leopards.

He made his international debut for Kenya in 2016.

References

External links
Victor Majid at Footballdatabase

1992 births
Living people
Kenyan footballers
Kenyan expatriate footballers
Kenya international footballers
SoNy Sugar F.C. players
Vegpro F.C. players
Bandari F.C. (Kenya) players
Kenya Commercial Bank S.C. players
Chemelil Sugar F.C. players
A.F.C. Leopards players
Mufulira Wanderers F.C. players
Kenyan Premier League players
Association football midfielders
Kenyan expatriate sportspeople in Zambia
Expatriate footballers in Zambia
People from Busia County